Sat Mahajan (30 July 1927 – 1 September 2012) was the Rural Development Minister of the Indian state of Himachal Pradesh.  He was a politician and a social worker.

Early Life
He was born in Nurpur, Kangra District.

Mahajan was the Secretary of the Current Affairs Society during his college years. He was the President of the Nurpur Municipal Committee for five consecutive terms. 

He visited Russia on an Indo-Soviet Friendship Mission. He also represented the country in the United Nations as a member of the parliamentary delegation. He was honoured with the Vaikunth Bhai Mehta Award by the Co-Operative Sector on 31 March 2003 in Delhi.

Political Career
He was the founder member of Indian Youth Congress. He has represented the Indian National Congress as one of the member delegations in the International Socialist Conference held in Lisbon. He was the President of the Kangra District Congress Committee and Pradesh Congress Committee for three terms.
Mahajan was elected to the State Legislative Assembly first in 1977 and then again in 1982, 1985, 1993 and in 2003. He also remained a Member of Parliament for the Kangra Parliamentary Constituency from 1996 to 1998. He was the Revenue Minister of Himachal Pradesh from May 1980 to January 1985. He was also the Transport Minister of Himachal Pradesh (1985-1986), later IPH Minister of Himachal Pradesh (1986-1990). He was the Chairman of Committee on Estimates from 1994 to 1995 and Rural Development Minister from 6 March 2003 onwards.

Death
On 1 September 2012, he died from cardiac arrest at Escort Hospital.  He had been hospitalized to undergo an angioplasty earlier that week, but had been discharged after surgery.

References

1927 births
People from Kangra district
2012 deaths
Indian National Congress politicians
Himachal Pradesh district councillors
India MPs 1996–1997
Lok Sabha members from Himachal Pradesh
Himachal Pradesh MLAs 1977–1982
Himachal Pradesh MLAs 1982–1985
Himachal Pradesh MLAs 1985–1990
Himachal Pradesh MLAs 1993–1998
Himachal Pradesh MLAs 2003–2007